Jacks Creek is a stream in the U.S. state of Georgia. It is a tributary to the Apalachee River.

Jacks Creek was named after John Clark (1766–1832), American politician and governor of Georgia.

References

Rivers of Georgia (U.S. state)
Rivers of Morgan County, Georgia
Rivers of Walton County, Georgia